The 2020–21 Ekstraklasa (also known as PKO Ekstraklasa due to sponsorship reasons) was the 95th season of the Polish Football Championship, the 87th season of the highest tier domestic division in the Polish football league system since its establishment in 1927 and the 13th season of the Ekstraklasa under its current title. The league was operated by the Ekstraklasa SA.

The regular season was played as a round-robin tournament. A total of 16 teams participated, 13 of which competed in the league during the previous season, while the remaining three were promoted from the 2019–20 I liga. On 24 July 2020 Ekstraklasa SA and Polish Football Association announced the 2020–21 season calendar. The season started on 21 August 2020 and concluded on 16 May 2021. Due to the season start being delayed due to the COVID-19 pandemic it was shortened to 30 matchdays without a split into Championship and Relegation groups. Each team played a total of 30 matches, half at home and half away. After the 14th matchday the league went on a winter break between 21 December 2020 and 28 January 2021. 2020–21 was a transition season (only the team which took 16th position after the season was relegated to I liga) to extend Ekstraklasa from 16 to 18 teams starting with the 2021–22 season. During 2020–21 season a substitution limit increased from three to five. It was the fourth Ekstraklasa season to use VAR. Due to the COVID-19 pandemic, only 51 matches were played with a limited number of spectators. The rest of the matches (between 17 October 2020 and 15 May 2021) were played behind closed doors without any spectators.

The two clubs promoted from I liga were Podbeskidzie Bielsko-Biała, returning to Ekstraklasa after four years, as well as Stal Mielec, who made a return to Ekstraklasa after 24 years. After winning the I liga promotion play-offs, Warta Poznań also returned to Ekstraklasa after 25 years.

Legia Warsaw were the defending champions, and won their 15th title overall on 28 April after Raków Częstochowa drew 0–0 away to Jagiellonia Białystok with three games remaining. The season's runner-up was Raków Częstochowa, and the third-placed team was Pogoń Szczecin. The only relegated team this season was Podbeskidzie Bielsko-Biała.

Teams
A total of 16 teams participate in the 2020–21 Ekstraklasa season.

Changes from last season

Stadiums and locations
Note: Table lists in alphabetical order.

 Upgrading to 31,871.
 Upgrading to 21,163.
 Due to the renovation of the Municipal Football Stadium "Raków" in Częstochowa, Raków played their home matches at the GIEKSA Arena in Bełchatów.
 Stadium used for two games behind closed doors – against Śląsk Wrocław (26th round) and Piast Gliwice (29th round)
 Due to the renovation of Warta Poznań Stadium in Poznań, Warta played their home matches at the Stadion Dyskobolii in Grodzisk Wielkopolski.

Personnel and kits

Managerial changes

Italics for interim managers.

League table

Positions by round
Note: The list does not include the matches postponed to a later date but includes all games played in advance.

The place taken by the team that played fewer matches than the opponents was underlined.

Results

Season statistics

Top goalscorers

Top assists

Hat-tricks

4 Player scored four goals.

Attendances

Awards

Monthly awards

Player of the Month

Young Player of the Month

Coach of the Month

Annual awards

Number of teams by region

See also
2020–21 I liga
2020–21 II liga
2020–21 III liga
2020–21 Polish Cup
2020 Polish SuperCup

Notes

References

External links
 
Ekstraklasa at uefa.com

Ekstraklasa seasons
1
Poland
Ekstraklasa